Paul Jacobus Botha (born 1 January 1998) is a South African male javelin thrower, who won an individual gold medal at the Youth World Championships.

References

External links

1998 births
Living people
South African male javelin throwers